Jerónimo Valdés (1784–1855) was a Spanish military figure and administrator.  Born in Villarín, in Asturias, he participated in the battle of Ayacucho (1824), which was a defeat for the Spanish.  He served as Viceroy of Navarre from 1833 to 1834 and also served as Minister of War.  He fought on the Liberal (Isabeline) side in the First Carlist War.  Valdés lost the Battle of Artaza (22 April 1835).

Valdés signed the Lord Eliot Convention soon after, regulating the treatment of prisoners during that war.

He later served as captain-general of Valencia, and of Galicia, and served as governor of Cuba from 1841 to September 1843.

References

External links
 Jerónimo Valdés

Royalists in the Hispanic American Revolution
Governors of Cuba
Captain Generals of Galicia
People from Asturias
Spanish generals
Military personnel of the First Carlist War
People of the Spanish colonial Americas
Viceroys of Navarre
1784 births
1855 deaths
19th-century South American people